Compsolechia molybdina is a moth of the family Gelechiidae. It was described by Walsingham in 1910. It is found in Mexico (Guerrero).

Description
The wingspan is about 14 mm. The forewings are shining, purplish-grey, with an inwardly diffused transverse fascia on the outer third, angulated outward about its middle and bounded along its outer edge by an indistinct narrow pale line, beyond which, after a slight purplish shade, the remainder of the wing to the apex is slaty grey, rather paler than the basal part. Around the termen and around the depressed obtusely angulated apex runs a blackish line at the base of the pale slaty grey cilia. The hindwings are brown.

Attributes
Compsolechia molybdina has the following traits:
Refracting superposition eyes
Wing morphology
Behavioral circadian rhythm

References

Moths described in 1910
Compsolechia